Kingma  is a surname of Frisian origin. It is derived from Kinge. Notable people with the surname include:

 Bruce Kingma (born 1961), American economist
 Elselijn Kingma, Dutch philosopher 
 Michael Kingma (born 1979), Australian basketball player
 Nienke Kingma (born 1982), Dutch rower
 Vivian Kingma, (born 1994), Dutch cricketer

References

Surnames of Frisian origin